Margaret Jacobsohn is a Namibian environmentalist. She was awarded the Goldman Environmental Prize in 1993, jointly with Garth Owen-Smith, for their efforts on conservation of wildlife in rural Namibia.

Biography 

She was born in South Africa, in Pretoria. She became an NGO worker in community-based natural resource management, in Namibia. Since 1983, in the northeast of Namibia, with Garth Owen-Smith, they have been fighting against endemic illegal hunting, which has decimated species such as black rhinos and desert elephants, and for the economic and social development of local populations. Through their actions, poaching is better controlled. Game guards are designated by the rural community. Other natural resources, such as palm trees, thatch grass, plant dyes and water lilies, are monitored. She became interested in semi-nomadic Himba people, devoting a book published in 2003 to them, Himba, nomads of Namibia. They are one of the few African groups that use red ochre, as a full-body make-up called otjize. The Himba originally belonged to the group of the Herero.

She was awarded the Goldman Environmental Prize in 1993, jointly with Garth Owen-Smith, and the Global 500 Roll of Honour in 1994. In 1996, following their initiatives, the Namibian government has adopted what is known as the Communal Areas Conservation Act.  This amendment allows rural communities living on state-owned land to manage and benefit from their own wildlife in the same way as farmers on private farms.

Works 
 Himba, nomads of Namibia,  photographs by Peter and Beverly Pickford, text by Margaret Jacobsohn, 2003

References 

Year of birth missing (living people)
Living people
White Namibian people
Namibian environmentalists
Namibian women environmentalists
20th-century Namibian people
21st-century Namibian people
20th-century Namibian women
21st-century Namibian women
Goldman Environmental Prize awardees